Juninia is a monotypic beetle genus in the family Cerambycidae described by Lane in 1966. Its only species, Juninia annulifera, was described by Theodor Franz Wilhelm Kirsch in 1889.

References

Hemilophini
Beetles described in 1889
Monotypic beetle genera